NGC 877 is an intermediate spiral galaxy located in the constellation Aries. It is located at a distance of circa 160 million light years from Earth, which, given its apparent dimensions, means that NGC 877 is about 115,000 light years across. It was discovered by William Herschel on October 14, 1784. It interacts with NGC 876.

NGC 877 features two spiral arms with a grand design pattern and slightly disturbed morphology. When pictured in H-alpha, the arms have numerous knots and appear brighter than the nucleus. The northwest part of the galaxy has higher polarised emission than the rest of the galaxy. A bar appears in radio waves.
The nucleus has activity that resembles that of a HII region. The galaxy has been categorised as a luminous infrared galaxy, a category of galaxies associated with high star formation rate.

One possible supernova has been observed in NGC 877, SN 2019rn. It was discovered by the robotic sky survey ATLAS on January 12.30, 2019, using  a twin 0.5m telescope system. It had apparent magnitude 18.9 on discovery. The supernova was initially classified as a type II supernova with spectroscopic observations by Keck-II, and further spectrographic observations categorised it as type IIb, although it could also be a cataclysmic variable or another type of variable star.

NGC 877 forms a pair with the edge-on spiral galaxy NGC 876, which lies 2.1 arcminutes to the southwest. At the distance of NGC 877, this corresponds to a projected distance of 30 kpc. A low surface brightness bridge connects the two galaxies. NGC 870 and NGC 871 are two other nearby galaxies. NGC 877 is the brightest and most massive member of a galaxy group known as the NGC 877 group or LGG 35. Other members of the group include NGC 876 and NGC 871, as well as UGC 1693, IC 1791, UGC 1773, and UGC 1817. The group contains large amounts of HI gas.

Gallery

References

External links 

NGC 877 on SIMBAD

Intermediate spiral galaxies
Luminous infrared galaxies
Aries (constellation)
0877
01768
08775
Astronomical objects discovered in 1784
Discoveries by William Herschel